Valerie Norona Galang-Sunga (born December 21, 1987) is a Filipino actress, television host, and endorser. She is known for her role as Nora Ferrer in the soap opera Sinasamba Kita but later transferred to its rival network ABS-CBN. She then became a host in Wowowee and Pilipinas Win na Win as well as the first incarnation of Banana Split in 2008. In June 2013, she transferred back to her home network GMA Network and was cast as Ruth Monteclaro, the main antagonist in Anna Karenina. In December 2013, she transferred back again in ABS-CBN network and was cast as Gigi in Annaliza. In June 2014, she went back to GMA Network as Lavender Catacutan in My BFF. She also played the role of Veronica Salcedo in the hit primetime TV series, Because of You. In 2018, she starred as the main antagonist in 2018–2019 Ika-5 Utos as Clarisse Alfonso-Buenaventura / Cynthia and later joined its rival show Kadenang Ginto as Cindy Dimaguiba. She also guested in 2019 Wowowin as a co-host of Willie Revillame. Concepcion graduated from Arellano University with a degree of Bachelor of Arts in Psychology.

Biography
Valerie Concepcion was born as Valerie Norona Galang on December 21, 1987, in Tondo, Manila, Philippines. She has one child. While taping in a scene of the drama series Sinasamba Kita in 2007, she was accidentally run over by the stunt driver, damaging her lower back. She ended up shooting some scenes in the hospital. The ensuing incident was played according to the scene.

In August 2018, she got engaged to her long-time non-showbiz boyfriend, Francis Sunga. The two got married in December 2019.

Filmography

Television

Films, and Movies

Awards

References

External links
 

1987 births
Living people
Filipino child actresses
Filipino film actresses
Participants in Philippine reality television series
Filipino television actresses
Star Magic
People from Tondo, Manila
Actresses from Manila
GMA Network personalities
ABS-CBN personalities
TV5 (Philippine TV network) personalities